Vincent Valentine Eguchukwu Ezeonyia (5 April 1941 – 8 February 2015) was a Roman Catholic bishop.

Ordained to the priesthood in 1968, Ezeonyia was appointed the first bishop of the Roman Catholic Diocese of Aba, Nigeria in 1990. He died while still in office.

Notes

1941 births
2015 deaths
20th-century Roman Catholic bishops in Nigeria
21st-century Roman Catholic bishops in Nigeria
Roman Catholic bishops of Aba